John Reed (born February 7, 1969) is an American novelist. He is the author of four novels: A Still Small Voice (2000), Snowball's Chance (2002) with a preface by Alexander Cockburn, The Whole (2005), and All the World's a Grave: A New Play by William Shakespeare (2008). His fifth book, Tales of Woe (2010), is a collection of twenty-five stories, chronicling true stories of abject misery.

Biography
Born in 1969 in New York City, Reed is the son of artists David Reed and Judy Rifka. He attended Hampshire College, and received a Masters in Fine Art in Creative Writing from Columbia University.  He teaches at The New School.

Reed was an early contributor to, and subsequently an editor with, Open City, a New York literary journal published by Robert Bingham, who later founded the book series.

Works 
He is affiliated with the New York Press and The Brooklyn Rail. "Americans are extremely sophisticated in terms of narrative forms," said Reed in an interview. "We see it in commercials, we see it on TV, we see it in movies. But the narrative forms we're talking about are three acts, five acts, depending on how you want to look at it. They're all based on a Christian model of sin, suffering, redemption; which is not a large model."

A Still Small Voice 
A Still Small Voice (Delacorte 2000, Delta 2001), Reed’s first novel, is a historical novel based on the life of a girl growing up in Kentucky from 1850-1870.

Snowball's Chance 

Snowball's Chance (Roof Books 2002/2003), Reed’s second novel was a controversial send-up of George Orwell’s Animal Farm, and ended in a cataclysmic attack on the “Twin Mills” (reminiscent of the 9/11 attack on the World Trade Center). It became a bestseller in the field of books by independent literary publishers.

The Whole, or, Duh Whole 

The Whole, Reed’s third novel, parodied MTV and was released in 2005 by MTV Books (Simon & Schuster). The novel described a gigantic hole that appears in the middle of the country, which engulfs four states.

All the World's a Grave 
In 2008, Reed returned  to the overhaul of canonical English writers in All the World's a Grave. This work, subtitled "A New Play by William Shakespeare", is a tragedy in five acts, a "mash-up" constructed of lines drawn from five Shakespeare tragedies and one Shakespeare history.

References

External links 
John Reed's website
Wikinews:John Reed on Orwell, God, self-destruction and the future of writing

1969 births
Living people
21st-century American novelists
American male novelists
American humorists
American parodists
Parody novelists
Novelists from New York (state)
Hampshire College alumni
Columbia University School of the Arts alumni
George Orwell
The New School faculty
People from Tribeca
21st-century American male writers